Astrée was an  of the French Navy.

Still incomplete, she was captured by the Germans during World War II in June 1940. She was renamed UF-3 on 13 May 1941, but never completed during the German occupation of France. She was recaptured and completed under her original name. Astrée was taken out of service in 1962, and stricken on 27 November 1965 as the Q404.

See also
List of submarines of France

References 

Aurore-class submarines
Ships built in France
1946 ships
World War II submarines of France
World War II submarines of Germany
Cold War submarines of France
Naval ships of France captured by Germany during World War II